Kavita Chahal (born 8 April 1985) is a 5' 9" tall heavyweight Indian female boxer and recipient of the highest world ranking 2 from 2012 to 2014 (AIBA Ranking - 11 in 2016) from the village Nimri which resides in the Bhiwani district, Haryana. In recognition of her achievements, the Government of India presented Chahal with the Arjuna Award in 2013. Chahal is the first female boxer from Haryana to be presented with the Arjuna Award. Chahal is a twice-consecutive World Championship medallist, 3 Time Gold medalist in World Police Games. 4-Time Asian championship, Asian cup medallist. With 9 gold medals, she is a record holder in women's national championship boxing. She is a 5-time gold medallist in the Federation Cup, and 7-times Gold medalist in all india police games 2012 to 2018. Chahal 3-time gold medallist in the Inter-zonal Super Cup championship.

Early life
Kavita was born to Sh. Bhup Singh and Ramesh Devi on 8 April 1985 at Nimri in the Bhiwani district of Haryana (India). Bhiwani is a well-known area in national boxing and also known for the amateur-turned professional boxer Vijender Singh.

Her initial training at boxing was handled by her father Bhup Singh, also a boxer. Once she had progressed, she then went on to train at the Bhiwani Boxing Club under the coach Jagdish Singh, who also handles the training of the Indian Ace Male Pugilist.

After winning medals and accolades for her state, and India, she went on to also become the first female boxer of Haryana state to be presented with the Arjun Award in 2013.

International achievements

National level achievements

National level records

Career best AIBA rankings

Awards and recognitions
 Arjun Award in 2013 
 Bhim Award in 2014

References

External links
Haryana Boxing Profile
Kavita Chahal- Success Story

Indian women boxers
1985 births
Living people
Boxers from Haryana
Recipients of the Arjuna Award
21st-century Indian women